The 1910 Shipley by-election was a parliamentary by-election held for the British House of Commons constituency of Shipley in the West Riding of Yorkshire on 10 March 1910.

Vacancy
The by-election was caused by the appointment of the sitting Liberal MP, Percy Illingworth to the post of  Junior Lord of the Treasury, i.e. one of the government whips. Under the Parliamentary rules applying at that time this required him to resign his seat and fight a by-election.

Candidates

Liberals
The Shipley Liberals re-selected Illingworth. He had been him returned unopposed in the general election of 1906 and had seen off a Liberal Unionist challenger in the general election held in January 1910 just a few weeks before by a healthy majority of 3775 votes. Shipley Liberals welcomed their member’s appointment to the government and foresaw no reason to doubt he would be re-elected in the forthcoming by-election.

Unionists
It was reported that the Unionists in the Shipley constituency were unprepared to fight another contest so soon after the general election  and the Shipley Division Liberal Unionists decided not to oppose Illingworth on the formal grounds that his appointment as a whip should not involve him in a fresh contest.

The result
There being no other candidates putting themselves forward, Illingworth was returned unopposed.

References

See also
List of United Kingdom by-elections 
United Kingdom by-election records

1910 elections in the United Kingdom
Unopposed ministerial by-elections to the Parliament of the United Kingdom in English constituencies
1910 in England
By-elections to the Parliament of the United Kingdom in Bradford constituencies
Shipley, West Yorkshire
1910s in Yorkshire
March 1910 events